Seilandsjøkelen is a glacier that is located on the island of Seiland in Troms og Finnmark county, Norway. The  glacier is located in the municipalities of Hammerfest and Alta.

References

Glaciers of Troms og Finnmark
Alta, Norway
Hammerfest